Warszawa Centralna, in English known as Warsaw Central Station, is the primary railway station in Warsaw, Poland. Completed in 1975, the station is located on the Warsaw Cross-City Line and features four underground island platforms with eight tracks in total. It is served by the long-distance domestic and international trains of PKP Intercity and Polregio as well as some of the regional trains operated by Koleje Mazowieckie. Adjacent to the north side of the building is a bus station that serves as the central hub for night bus lines, and Złote Tarasy shopping center.

History 

Warsaw Central was constructed as a flagship project of the Polish People's Republic during the 1970s economic boom, and was intended to replace the inadequate and obsolete Warszawa Główna railway station.

However, the project encountered substantial problems from the very beginning. The station's design was innovative, but construction was plagued by continuous alterations to the scope of work which in turn hurt functionality and operations upon completion. These problems were partially a result of a hasty completion schedule, with the opening date set to coincide with Leonid Brezhnev's 1975 visit to Warsaw. The design and construction problems necessitated immediate repairs that would continue through the 1980s. Despite the deficiencies, the structure was fairly advanced for its time and incorporated such features as automatic doors, as well as escalators and elevators for each platform. Moreover, the each platform was equipped with WC, phone and glazed waiting room.

After a period of decline, a cosmetic upgrade of the station in 2010-2011 was completed in time for the Euro 2012 championships. Between 2015 and 2016, a mezzanine connecting the waiting room in the west wing to the restaurants in the east wing was constructed. It has been both praised for improving the utilization of space in the main hall and criticized for its futuristic design, which clashes with the building's modernist architecture. The Warsaw city government is contemplating demolishing and replacing the station, either at the same location or farther from the city center. Some elements of the Warsaw press (e.g. Gazeta Wyborcza and Architektura Murator, 2012), as well as Swiss architect and journalist Werner Huber, have argued against demolition, claiming that the current Warszawa Centralna is a great example and a masterpiece of modernism in Poland.

The station is fully accessible to the disabled as well as passengers with heavy luggage.

Location 
Warszawa Centralna is connected by an underground passage to two other rail stations: to the west lies Warszawa Śródmieście WKD railway station, the terminus of the WKD suburban light rail line, and to the east lies Warszawa Śródmieście PKP, served by suburban trains run by Koleje Mazowieckie and Szybka Kolej Miejska.

International train services

Domestic Train services
The station is served by the following service(s):

Express Intercity Premium services (EIP) Gdynia - Warsaw
Express Intercity Premium services (EIP) Warsaw - Wrocław
Express Intercity Premium services (EIP) Warsaw - Katowice - Bielsko-Biała
Express Intercity Premium services (EIP) Gdynia - Warsaw - Katowice - Gliwice/Bielsko-Biała
Express Intercity Premium services (EIP) Warsaw - Kraków
Express Intercity Premium services (EIP) Gdynia/Kołobrzeg - Warsaw - Kraków (- Rzeszów)
Express Intercity services (EIC) Szczecin — Warsaw 
Express Intercity services (EIC) Warsaw - Wrocław 
Express Intercity services (EIC) Warsaw - Kraków - Zakopane 
Intercity services (IC) Wrocław- Opole - Częstochowa - Warszawa
 Intercity services (IC) Wrocław - Ostrów Wielkopolski - Łódź - Warszawa
Intercity services (IC) Białystok - Warszawa - Częstochowa - Opole - Wrocław
Intercity services (IC) Białystok - Warszawa - Łódź - Ostrów Wielkopolski - Wrocław
Intercity services (IC) Ełk - Białystok - Warszawa - Łódź - Ostrów Wielkopolski - Wrocław
Intercity services (IC) Olsztyn - Warszawa - Skierniewice - Częstochowa - Katowice - Gliwice - Racibórz
Intercity services (IC) Olsztyn - Warszawa - Skierniewice - Łódź
Intercity services (IC) Olsztyn - Warszawa - Skierniewice - Częstochowa - Katowice - Bielsko-Biała
Intercity services (IC) Olsztyn - Warszawa - Skierniewice - Częstochowa - Katowice - Gliwice - Racibórz
Intercity services (TLK) Warszawa - Częstochowa - Lubliniec - Opole - Wrocław - Szklarska Poręba Górna
Intercity services (TLK) Warszawa - Częstochowa - Katowice - Opole - Wrocław - Szklarska Poręba Górna
Intercity services (TLK) Gdynia Główna — Zakopane 
Regional services (ŁKA) Łódz - Warsaw

See also
Rail transport in Poland
List of busiest railway stations in Poland

References

External links 

Satellite photo via Google Maps
Track diagram

Railway stations in Poland opened in 1975
Centralna
Railway stations served by Koleje Mazowieckie
Railway stations served by Przewozy Regionalne InterRegio
Śródmieście, Warsaw